Regina Maria is a commune in Soroca District, Moldova. It is composed of two villages, Lugovoe and Regina Maria.

References

Communes of Soroca District